Kevin Martin may refer to:

Sports 
 Kevin Martin (basketball, born 1983), American former professional basketball player in NBA
 Kevin Martin (basketball, born 1975), American former professional basketball player in Finland
 Kevin Martin (boxer) (1925-1983), Irish Olympic boxer
 Kevin Martin (curler) (born 1966), Canadian curler
 Kevin Martin (hurler) (born 1973), Irish hurler, plays for Tullamore and Offaly
 Kevin Martin (footballer) (born 1995), Swiss footballer

Others 
 Kevin Martin (American musician) (born 1969), singer of Candlebox and The Gracious Few
 Kevin Martin (British musician), of God, Techno Animal, and The Bug
 Kevin Martin (FCC) (born 1966), former chair of the U.S. Federal Communications Commission